Lake Tolvajärvi is a group of lakes in the Republic of Karelia, in the Ladoga Karelia. It is a part of the Vuoksi drainage basin. The group of lakes have flows through rivers to the Finnish Lake Pielinen.

History 
Before the Winter War, the lake was part of the Korpiselkä municipality. During the war the area was a scene of the battle of Tolvajärvi. The Tolvajärvi area also served as a battlefield during the Continuation War.

References 

Tolvayarvi
LTolvayarvi